2018 Indonesian tsunami may refer to:

2018 Sulawesi earthquake and tsunami
2018 Sunda Strait tsunami